Winnipeg was a federal electoral district in Manitoba, Canada, that was represented in the House of Commons of Canada from 1882 to 1917.

This riding was created in 1882 from parts of Selkirk riding.

It was abolished in 1914 when it was redistributed into Winnipeg Centre, Winnipeg North and Winnipeg South ridings.

It consisted of the city of Winnipeg and the municipality of Fort Rouge.

Election results

By-election: On Mr. Macdonald's resignation, 4 May 1893

By-election: On election being declared void, 29 March 1897

By-election: On Mr. Jameson's death, 3 February 1899

 
|Independent Labour
|PUTTEE, Arthur W. ||align=right|3,441 

By-election: On Mr. Haggart's resignation, 11 October 1911

See also 
 List of Canadian federal electoral districts
 Past Canadian electoral districts

External links 
Riding history for Winnipeg (1882–1914) from the Library of Parliament

Former federal electoral districts of Manitoba